Batsaikhany Tegshbayar (born 1 June 1998) is a Mongolian cyclist, who currently rides for UCI Continental team .

Major results

Track 
2016
 1st  Scratch, UCI Junior World Track Championships
2018
 3rd  Scratch, Asian Track Championships
2019
 2nd  Scratch, Asian Track Championships

Road 

2015
 10th Time trial, Asian Junior Road Championships
2018
 National Under-23 Road Championships
1st  Time trial
2nd Road race
2019
 National Under-23 Road Championships
1st  Time trial
2nd Road race
 5th Time trial, Asian Under-23 Road Championships
 5th Overall Tour of Quanzhou Bay
2020
 National Road Championships
3rd Time trial
4th Road race
2021
 3rd Time trial, National Road Championships
2022
 2nd  Team time trial, Asian Road Championships
 5th Time trial, National Road Championships

References

External links
 

1998 births
Living people
Mongolian male cyclists
21st-century Mongolian people